

Events

Pre-1600
 752 – Mayan king Bird Jaguar IV of Yaxchilan in modern-day Chiapas, Mexico, assumes the throne.
1481 – The largest of three earthquakes strikes the island of Rhodes and causes an estimated 30,000 casualties.
1491 – Kongo monarch Nkuwu Nzinga is baptised by Portuguese missionaries, adopting the baptismal name of João I.
1568 – Angered by the brutal onslaught of Spanish troops at Fort Caroline, a French force burns the San Mateo fort and massacres hundreds of Spaniards.

1601–1900
1616 – Treaty of Loudun ends a French civil war.
1715 – A total solar eclipse is visible across northern Europe and northern Asia, as predicted by Edmond Halley to within four minutes accuracy.
1791 – The Constitution of May 3 (the first modern constitution in Europe) is proclaimed by the Sejm of Polish–Lithuanian Commonwealth.
1802 – Washington, D.C. is incorporated as a city after Congress abolishes the Board of Commissioners, the District's founding government. The "City of Washington" is given a mayor-council form of government.
1808 – Finnish War: Sweden loses the fortress of Sveaborg to Russia.
  1808   – Peninsular War: The Madrid rebels who rose up on May 2 are executed near Príncipe Pío hill.
1815 – Neapolitan War: Joachim Murat, King of Naples, is defeated by the Austrians at the Battle of Tolentino, the decisive engagement of the war.
1830 – The Canterbury and Whitstable Railway is opened; it is the first steam-hauled passenger railway to issue season tickets and include a tunnel.
1837 – The University of Athens is founded in Athens, Greece.
1848 – The boar-crested Anglo-Saxon Benty Grange helmet is discovered in a barrow on the Benty Grange farm in Derbyshire.
1849 – The May Uprising in Dresden begins: The last of the German revolutions of 1848–49.
1855 – American adventurer William Walker departs from San Francisco with about 60 men to conquer Nicaragua.

1901–present
1901 – The Great Fire of 1901 begins in Jacksonville, Florida.
1913 – Raja Harishchandra, the first full-length Indian feature film, is released, marking the beginning of the Indian film industry.
1920 – A Bolshevik coup fails in the Democratic Republic of Georgia.
1921 – Ireland is partitioned under British law by the Government of Ireland Act 1920, creating Northern Ireland and Southern Ireland.
  1921   – West Virginia becomes the first state to legislate a broad sales tax, but does not implement it until a number of years later due to enforcement issues.
1928 – The Jinan incident begins with the deaths of twelve Japanese civilians by Chinese forces in Jinan, China, which leads to Japanese retaliation and the deaths of over 2,000 Chinese civilians in the following days.
1939 – The All India Forward Bloc is formed by Netaji Subhas Chandra Bose.
1942 – World War II: Japanese naval troops invade Tulagi Island in the Solomon Islands during the first part of Operation Mo that results in the Battle of the Coral Sea between Japanese forces and forces from the United States and Australia.
1945 – World War II: Sinking of the prison ships Cap Arcona, Thielbek and Deutschland by the Royal Air Force in  Lübeck Bay.
1947 – New post-war Japanese constitution goes into effect.
1948 – The U.S. Supreme Court rules in Shelley v. Kraemer that covenants prohibiting the sale of real estate to blacks and other minorities are legally unenforceable.
1951 – London's Royal Festival Hall opens with the Festival of Britain.
  1951   – The United States Senate Committee on Armed Services and United States Senate Committee on Foreign Relations begin their closed door hearings into the relief of Douglas MacArthur by U.S. President Harry Truman.
1952 – Lieutenant Colonels Joseph O. Fletcher and William P. Benedict of the United States land a plane at the North Pole.
  1952   – The Kentucky Derby is televised nationally for the first time, on the CBS network.
1957 – Walter O'Malley, the owner of the Brooklyn Dodgers, agrees to move the team from Brooklyn to Los Angeles.
1963 – The police force in Birmingham, Alabama switches tactics and responds with violent force to stop the "Birmingham campaign" protesters. Images of the violent suppression are transmitted worldwide, bringing new-found attention to the civil rights movement.
1968 – Eighty-five people are killed when Braniff International Airways Flight 352 crashes near Dawson, Texas.
1971 – Erich Honecker becomes First Secretary of the Socialist Unity Party of Germany, remaining in power until 1989.
1978 – The first unsolicited bulk commercial email (which would later become known as "spam") is sent by a Digital Equipment Corporation marketing representative to every ARPANET address on the west coast of the United States. 
1979 – Margaret Thatcher wins the United Kingdom general election. The following day, she becomes the first female British Prime Minister.
1986 – Twenty-one people are killed and forty-one are injured after a bomb explodes on Air Lanka Flight 512 at Colombo airport in Sri Lanka.
1987 – A crash by Bobby Allison at the Talladega Superspeedway, Alabama fencing at the start-finish line would lead NASCAR to develop the restrictor plate for the following season both at Daytona International Speedway and Talladega.
1999 – The southwestern portion of Oklahoma City is devastated by an F5 tornado, killing forty-five people, injuring 665, and causing $1 billion in damage. The tornado is one of 66 from the 1999 Oklahoma tornado outbreak. This tornado also produces the highest wind speed ever recorded, measured at 301 +/- 20 mph (484 +/- 32 km/h).
  1999   – Infiltration of Pakistani soldiers on Indian side results in the Kargil War.
2000 – The sport of geocaching begins, with the first cache placed and the coordinates from a GPS posted on Usenet.
2001 – The United States loses its seat on the U.N. Human Rights Commission for the first time since the commission was formed in 1947.
2006 – Armavia Flight 967 crashes into the Black Sea near Sochi International Airport in Sochi, Russia, killing 113 people.
2007 – The three-year-old British girl Madeleine McCann disappears in Praia da Luz, Portugal, starting "the most heavily reported missing-person case in modern history".
2015 – Two gunmen launch an attempted attack on an anti-Islam event in Garland, Texas, which was held in response to the Charlie Hebdo shooting.
2016 – Eighty-eight thousand people are evacuated from their homes in Fort McMurray, Alberta, Canada as a wildfire rips through the community, destroying approximately 2,400 homes and buildings.

Births

Pre-1600
 490 – K'an Joy Chitam I, ruler of Palenque (d. 565)
 612 – Constantine III, Byzantine emperor (d. 641)
1238 – Emilia Bicchieri, Italian saint (d. 1314)
1276 – Louis, Count of Évreux, son of King Philip III of France (d. 1319)
1415 – Cecily Neville, Duchess of York (d. 1495)
1428 – Pedro González de Mendoza, Spanish cardinal (d. 1495)
1446 – Margaret of York (d. 1503)
1461 – Raffaele Riario, Italian cardinal (d. 1521)
1469 – Niccolò Machiavelli, Italian historian and philosopher (d. 1527)
1479 – Henry V, Duke of Mecklenburg (d. 1552)
1481 – Juana de la Cruz Vázquez Gutiérrez, Spanish abbess of the Franciscan Third Order Regular (d. 1534)
1536 – Stephan Praetorius, German theologian (d. 1603)

1601–1900
1632 – Catherine of St. Augustine, French-Canadian nurse and candidate for sainthood, founded the Hôtel-Dieu de Québec (d. 1668)
1662 – Matthäus Daniel Pöppelmann, German architect, designed the Pillnitz Castle (d. 1736)
1678 – Amaro Pargo, Spanish corsair (d. 1747)
1695 – Henri Pitot, French physicist and engineer, invented the Pitot tube (d. 1771)
1729 – Florian Leopold Gassmann, Czech composer (d. 1774)
1761 – August von Kotzebue, German playwright and author (d. 1819)
1764 – Princess Élisabeth of France (d. 1794)
1768 – Charles Tennant, Scottish chemist and businessman (d. 1838)
1783 – José de la Riva Agüero, Peruvian soldier and politician, 1st President of Peru and 2nd President of North Peru (d. 1858)
1814 – Adams George Archibald, Canadian lawyer and politician, 4th Lieutenant Governor of Nova Scotia (d. 1892)
1826 – Charles XV of Sweden (d. 1872)
1844 – Richard D'Oyly Carte, English talent agent and composer (d. 1901)
1849 – Jacob Riis, Danish-American journalist and photographer (d. 1914)
  1849   – Bernhard von Bülow, German soldier and politician, Chancellor of Germany (d. 1929)
1854 – George Gore, American baseball player and manager (d. 1933)
1859 – August Herrmann, American executive in Major League Baseball (d.1931)
1860 – Vito Volterra, Italian mathematician and physicist (d. 1940)
1867 – Andy Bowen, American boxer (d. 1894)
  1867   – J. T. Hearne, English cricketer (d. 1944)
1870 – Princess Helena Victoria of Schleswig-Holstein (d. 1948)
1871 – Emmett Dalton, American criminal (d. 1937)
1873 – Pavlo Skoropadskyi, German-Ukrainian general and politician, Hetman of Ukraine (d. 1945)
1874 – François Coty, French businessman and publisher, founded Coty, Inc. (d. 1934)
  1874   – Vagn Walfrid Ekman, Swedish oceanographer and academic (d. 1954)
1877 – Karl Abraham, German psychoanalyst and author (d. 1925)
1879 – Fergus McMaster, Australian businessman and soldier, co-founded Qantas  (d. 1950)
1886 – Marcel Dupré, French organist and composer (d. 1971)
1887 – Marika Kotopouli, Greek actress (d. 1954)
1889 – Beulah Bondi, American actress (d. 1981)
  1889   – Gottfried Fuchs, German-Canadian Olympic soccer player (d. 1972)
1891 – Tadeusz Peiper, Polish poet and critic (d. 1969)
  1891   – Eppa Rixey, American baseball pitcher (d. 1963)
1892 – George Paget Thomson, English physicist and academic, Nobel Prize laureate (d. 1975)
  1892   – Jacob Viner, Canadian-American economist and academic (d. 1970)
1893 – Konstantine Gamsakhurdia, Georgian author (d. 1975)
1895 – Cornelius Van Til, Dutch philosopher, theologian, and apologist (d. 1987)
1896 – Karl Allmenröder, German soldier and pilot (d. 1917)
  1896   – V. K. Krishna Menon, Indian lawyer, jurist, and politician, Indian Minister of Defence (d. 1974)
  1896   – Dodie Smith, English author and playwright (d. 1990)
1897 – William Joseph Browne, Canadian lawyer and politician, 20th Solicitor General of Canada (d. 1989)
1898 – Septima Poinsette Clark, American educator and activist (d. 1987)
  1898   – Golda Meir, Ukrainian-Israeli educator and politician, 4th Prime Minister of Israel (d. 1978)

1901–present
1902 – Alfred Kastler, German-French physicist and poet, Nobel Prize laureate (d. 1984)
1903 – Bing Crosby, American singer and actor (d. 1977)
1905 – Edmund Black, American hammer thrower (d. 1996)
  1905   – Werner Fenchel, German-Danish mathematician and academic (d. 1988)
  1905   – Red Ruffing, American baseball pitcher and coach (d. 1986)
1906 – Mary Astor, American actress (d. 1987)
  1906   – René Huyghe, French historian and author (d. 1997)
  1906   – Anna Roosevelt Halsted, American journalist and author (d. 1975)
  1906   – Enrique Laguerre, Puerto Rican journalist, author, and playwright (d. 2005)
1910 – Norman Corwin, American screenwriter and producer (d. 2011)
1912 – Virgil Fox, American organist and composer (d. 1980)
  1912   – May Sarton, American poet, novelist and memoirist (d. 1995)
1913 – William Inge, American playwright and novelist (d. 1973)
1914 – Georges-Emmanuel Clancier, French journalist, author, and poet (d. 2018))
1915 – Stu Hart, Canadian wrestler and trainer, founded Stampede Wrestling (d. 2003)
  1915   – Richard Lippold, American sculptor and academic (d. 2002)
1916 – Léopold Simoneau, Canadian tenor and actor (d. 2006)
1917 – Betty Comden, American screenwriter and librettist (d. 2006)
  1917   – George Gaynes, Finnish-American actor (d. 2016)
1918 – Ted Bates, English footballer and manager (d. 2003)
1919 – Traute Lafrenz, German member of the White Rose resistance group (d. 2023)
  1919   – John Cullen Murphy, American soldier and illustrator (d. 2004)
  1919   – Pete Seeger, American singer-songwriter, guitarist, and activist (d. 2014)
1920 – John Lewis, American pianist and composer (d. 2001)
1921 – Sugar Ray Robinson, American boxer (d. 1989)
1922 – Len Shackleton, English footballer and journalist (d. 2000)
1923 – George Hadjinikos, Greek pianist, conductor, and educator (d. 2015)
  1923   – Ralph Hall, American lieutenant, lawyer, and politician (d. 2019)
1924 – Yehuda Amichai, German-Israeli author and poet (d. 2000)
  1924   – Ken Tyrrell, English race car driver, founded Tyrrell Racing (d. 2001)
1925 – Jean Séguy, French sociologist and author (d. 2007)
1926 – Matt Baldwin, Canadian curler and engineer
1928 – Dave Dudley, American singer-songwriter (d. 2003)
  1928   – Jacques-Louis Lions, French mathematician (d. 2001)
1929 – Denise Lor, American singer and actress (d. 2015)
1930 – Juan Gelman, Argentinian poet and author (d. 2014)
  1930   – David Harrison, English chemist and academic
1931 – Vasily Rudenkov, Belarusian hammer thrower (d. 1982)
  1931   – Sait Maden, Turkish translator, poet, painter and graphic designer  (d. 2013)
1932 – Robert Osborne, American actor and historian (d. 2017)
1933 – James Brown, American singer-songwriter, producer, and actor (d. 2006)
  1933   – Steven Weinberg, American physicist and academic, Nobel Prize laureate (d. 2021)
1934 – Henry Cooper, English boxer and sportscaster (d. 2011)
  1934   – Georges Moustaki, Egyptian-French singer-songwriter and guitarist (d. 2013)
  1934   – Frankie Valli, American singer and actor 
1935 – Ron Popeil, American businessman, founded the Ronco Company  (d. 2021)
1937 – Nélida Piñon, Brazilian author and academic
1938 – Omar Abdel-Rahman, Egyptian terrorist (d. 2017)
  1938   – Chris Cannizzaro, American baseball player (d. 2016)
  1938   – Napoleon XIV,  American singer, songwriter and record producer 
1939 – Jonathan Harvey, English composer and educator (d. 2012)
1940 – David Koch, American engineer, businessman, and philanthropist (d. 2019)
  1940   – Clemens Westerhof, Dutch footballer and manager
1941 – Alexander Harley, English general
  1941   – Edward Malloy, American priest and academic
1942 – Věra Čáslavská, Czech gymnast and coach (d. 2016)
  1942   – Dave Marash, American journalist and sportscaster
  1942   – Butch Otter, American soldier and politician, 32nd Governor of Idaho
1943 – Yukio Hashi, Japanese singer and actor
  1943   – Jim Risch, American lawyer and politician, 31st Governor of Idaho
  1943   – Vicente Saldivar, Mexican boxer (d. 1985)
1944 – Peter Doyle, English bishop
  1944   – Pete Staples, English bass player 
1945 – Jörg Drehmel, German triple jumper and coach
  1945   – Davey Lopes, American baseball player, coach, and manager
1946 – Norm Chow, American football player and coach
  1946   – Silvino Francisco, South African snooker player
  1946   – Greg Gumbel, American sportscaster
1947 – Doug Henning, Canadian magician (d. 2000)
1948 – Denis Cosgrove, British-American academic and geographer (d. 2008)
  1948   – Chris Mulkey, American actor
1949 – Liam Donaldson, English physician and academic
  1949   – Ruth Lister, Baroness Lister of Burtersett, English academic and politician
  1949   – Ron Wyden, American academic and politician
1950 – Mary Hopkin, Welsh singer-songwriter
  1950   – Dag Arnesen, Norwegian pianist and composer
1951 – Alan Clayson, English singer-songwriter and journalist
  1951   – Christopher Cross, American singer-songwriter and producer
  1951   – Ashok Gehlot, Indian politician, 21st Chief Minister of Rajasthan
  1951   – Tatyana Tolstaya, Russian author and publicist
1952 – Chuck Baldwin, American pastor and politician
  1952   – Caitlin Clarke, American actress (d. 2004)
  1952   – Joseph W. Tobin, American cardinal
1953 – Bruce Hall, American singer-songwriter, bass player, and producer 
  1953   – Jake Hooker, Israeli-American guitarist and songwriter (d. 2014)
1954 – Angela Bofill, American singer-songwriter
  1954   – Jean-Marc Roberts, French author and screenwriter (d. 2013)
1955 – Stephen D. M. Brown, British geneticist
  1955   – Colin Deans, Scottish rugby player
  1955   – David Hookes, Australian cricketer, coach, and sportscaster (d. 2004)
  1955   – Seishirō Nishida, Japanese actor
1956 – Marc Bellemare, Canadian lawyer and politician
1957 – Alain Côté, Canadian ice hockey player
  1957   – Rod Langway, Taiwanese-American ice hockey player and coach
1958 – Bill Sienkiewicz, American author and illustrator
  1958   – Sandi Toksvig, Danish-English comedian, writer, and broadcaster
1959 – David Ball, English keyboard player and producer 
  1959   – Uma Bharti, Indian activist and politician, 16th Chief Minister of Madhya Pradesh
  1959   – Ben Elton, English actor, director, and screenwriter
1960 – Kathy Smallwood-Cook, English sprinter and educator
1961 – Steve McClaren, English footballer and manager
  1961   – David Vitter, American lawyer and politician
  1961   – Leyla Zana, Kurdish activist and politician
1962 – Anders Graneheim, Swedish bodybuilder
1963 – Jeff Hornacek, American basketball player and coach
  1963   – Mona Siddiqui, Pakistani-Scottish journalist and academic
1964 – Sterling Campbell, American drummer and songwriter 
  1964   – Ron Hextall, Canadian-American ice hockey player and manager
1965 – Ignatius Aphrem II, Syrian patriarch
  1965   – Mark Cousins, Northern Irish director, writer, cinematographer
  1965   – John Jensen, Danish footballer and coach
  1965   – Mikhail Prokhorov, Russian businessman
1966 – Giorgos Agorogiannis, Greek footballer
  1966   – Frank Dietrich, German politician (d. 2011)
1967 – Daniel Anderson, Australian rugby league coach and manager
  1967   – Kenneth Joel Hotz, Canadian producer, writer, director, actor, and comedian  
1968 – Viliami Ofahengaue, Tongan-Australian rugby player
1971 – Douglas Carswell, British politician, the first elected MP for the UK Independence Party
1972 – Steve Barclay, English lawyer and politician
1973 – Jamie Baulch, Welsh sprinter and television host
1975 – Willie Geist, American television journalist and host
1976 – Jeff Halpern, American ice hockey player
  1976   – Brad Scott, Australian footballer and coach
  1976   – Chris Scott, Australian footballer and coach
1977 – Eric Church, American country music singer-songwriter
  1977   – Ryan Dempster, Canadian baseball player and sportscaster
  1977   – Tyronn Lue, American basketball player and coach
  1977   – Maryam Mirzakhani, Iranian mathematician (d. 2017)
  1977   – Ben Olsen, American soccer player and coach
1978 – Christian Annan, Ghanaian-Hong Kong footballer
  1978   – Paul Banks, English-American singer-songwriter and guitarist 
  1978   – Dai Tamesue, Japanese hurdler
  1978   – Lawrence Tynes, American football player
1979 – Steve Mack, American wrestler
  1979   – Anastasiya Shvedova, Belarusian pole vaulter
1980 – Zuzana Ondrášková, Czech tennis player
1982 – Igor Olshansky, Ukrainian-American football player
  1982   – Nick Stavinoha, American baseball player
1983 – Joseph Addai, American football player
  1983   – Romeo Castelen, Dutch footballer
  1983   – Jérôme Clavier, French pole vaulter
  1983   – Márton Fülöp, Hungarian footballer (d. 2015)
1984 – Jacqui Dunn, Australian artistic gymnast
1985 – Ezequiel Lavezzi, Argentinian footballer
  1985   – Kadri Lehtla, Estonian biathlete
  1985   – Miko Mälberg, Estonian swimmer
1986 – Moon Byung-woo, South Korean footballer
1987 – Lina Grinčikaitė, Lithuanian sprinter
  1987   – Damla Sönmez, Turkish actress
1988 – Ben Revere, American baseball player
  1988   – Paddy Holohan, Irish mixed martial artist
1989 – Jesse Bromwich, New Zealand rugby league player
  1989   – Katinka Hosszú, Hungarian swimmer
1990 – Alexandra Cadanțu-Ignatik, Romanian tennis player
1990 – Brooks Koepka, American golfer
  1990   – James Pattinson, Australian cricketer
1991 – Samuel Seo, South Korean musician
1992 – Aaron Whitchurch, Australian rugby league player
1995 – Ivan Bukavshin, Russian chess player (d. 2016)
1996 – Mary Cain, American runner
  1996   – Alex Iwobi, Nigerian football player
  1996   – Domantas Sabonis, Lithuanian basketball player
1997 – Desiigner, American rapper
  1997   – Dwayne Haskins, American football player (d. 2022)
  1997   – Ivana Jorović, Serbian tennis player
  2003 – Elsa Jacquemot, French tennis player

Deaths

Pre-1600
 678 – Tōchi, Japanese princess
 738 – Uaxaclajuun Ub'aah K'awiil, Mayan ruler (ajaw)
1152 – Matilda of Boulogne (b. 1105)
1270 – Béla IV of Hungary (b. 1206)
1294 – John I, Duke of Brabant (b. 1252)
1330 – Alexios II Megas Komnenos, Emperor of Trebizond (b. 1282)
1410 – Antipope Alexander V
1481 – Mehmed the Conqueror, Ottoman sultan (b. 1432)
1501 – John Devereux, 9th Baron Ferrers of Chartley, English Baron (b. 1463)
1524 – Richard Grey, 3rd Earl of Kent, English peer (b. 1481)
1534 – Juana de la Cruz Vazquez Gutierrez, Spanish Roman Catholic nun and venerable (b. 1481)
1589 – Julius, Duke of Brunswick-Lüneburg (b. 1528)

1601–1900
1606 – Henry Garnet, English priest and author (b. 1555)
1621 – Elizabeth Bacon, English Tudor gentlewoman (b. 1541)
1679 – James Sharp, Scottish archbishop (b. 1613)
1693 – Claude de Rouvroy, duc de Saint-Simon, French courtier (b. 1607)
1704 – Heinrich Ignaz Franz Biber, Czech-Austrian violinist and composer (b. 1644)
1724 – John Leverett the Younger, American lawyer, academic, and politician (b. 1662)
1750 – John Willison, Scottish minister and author (b. 1680)
1752 – Samuel Ogle, English-American captain and politician, 5th Governor of Restored Proprietary Government (b. 1692)
1758 – Pope Benedict XIV (b. 1675)
1763 – George Psalmanazar, French-English author (b. 1679)
1764 – Francesco Algarotti, Italian philosopher, poet, and critic (b. 1712)
1779 – John Winthrop, American mathematician, physicist, and astronomer (b. 1714)
1793 – Martin Gerbert, German historian and theologian (b. 1720)
1839 – Ferdinando Paer, Italian composer (b. 1771)
1856 – Adolphe Adam, French composer and critic (b. 1803)
  1856   – Louis-Étienne Saint-Denis, Arab-French servant to Napoleon I (b. 1788)
1882 – Leonidas Smolents, Austrian–Greek general and army minister (b. 1806)

1901–present
1910 – Howard Taylor Ricketts, American pathologist (b. 1871)
1916 – Tom Clarke, Irish rebel (b. 1858)
  1916   – Thomas MacDonagh, Irish poet and rebel (b. 1878)
  1916   – Patrick Pearse, Irish teacher and rebel leader (b. 1879)
1918 – Charlie Soong, Chinese businessman and missionary (b. 1863)
1919 – Elizabeth Almira Allen, American educator (b. 1854)
1921 – Théodore Pilette, Belgian race car driver (b. 1883)
1925 – Clément Ader, French engineer, designed the Ader Avion III (b. 1841)
1932 – Charles Fort, American journalist and author (b. 1874)
1935 – Jessie Willcox Smith, American illustrator (b. 1863)
1939 – Madeleine Desroseaux, French author and poet (b. 1873)
1942 – Thorvald Stauning, Danish politician, 24th Prime Minister of Denmark (b. 1873)
1943 – Harry Miller, American engineer (b. 1875)
1948 – Ernst Tandefelt, Finnish assassin of Heikki Ritavuori (b. 1876)
1949 – Fanny Walden, English footballer and cricketer (b. 1888)
1958 – Frank Foster, English cricketer (b. 1889)
1969 – Zakir Husain, Indian academic and politician, 3rd President of India (b. 1897)
1970 – Cemil Gürgen Erlertürk, Turkish footballer, coach, and pilot (b. 1918)
1972 – Kenneth Bailey, Australian lawyer and diplomat, Australian High Commissioner to Canada (b. 1898)
  1972   – Emil Breitkreutz, American runner and coach (b. 1883)
  1972   – Bruce Cabot, American actor (b. 1904)
1978 – Bill Downs, American journalist (b. 1914)
1981 – Nargis, Indian actress (b. 1929)
1986 – Robert Alda, American actor (b. 1914)
1987 – Dalida, Italian singer, actress, dancer, and model (b. 1933)
1988 – Lev Pontryagin, Russian mathematician and academic (b. 1908)
1989 – Christine Jorgensen, American trans woman (b. 1926)
1991 – Jerzy Kosiński, Polish-American novelist and screenwriter (b. 1933)
1992 – George Murphy, American actor, dancer, and politician (b. 1902)
1996 – Dimitri Fampas, Greek guitarist, composer, and educator (b. 1921)
  1996   – Alex Kellner, American baseball player (b. 1924)
  1996   – Jack Weston, American actor (b. 1924)
1997 – Sébastien Enjolras, French race car driver (b. 1976)
  1997   – Narciso Yepes, Spanish guitarist and composer (b. 1927)
1998 – Gene Raymond, American actor (b. 1908)
1999 – Joe Adcock, American baseball player and manager (b. 1927)
  1999   – Steve Chiasson, Canadian-American ice hockey player (b. 1967)
  1999   – Godfrey Evans, English cricketer (b. 1920)
2000 – Júlia Báthory, Hungarian glass designer (b. 1901)
  2000   – John Joseph O'Connor, American cardinal (b. 1920)
2002 – Barbara Castle, Baroness Castle of Blackburn, English politician, First Secretary of State (b. 1910)
  2002   – Yevgeny Svetlanov, Russian pianist, composer, and conductor (b. 1928)
2003 – Suzy Parker, American model and actress (b. 1932)
2004 – Ken Downing, English race car driver (b. 1917)
  2004   – Darrell Johnson, American baseball player, coach, and manager (b. 1928)
2006 – Karel Appel, Dutch painter, sculptor, and poet (b. 1921)
  2006   – Pramod Mahajan, Indian politician (b. 1949)
  2006   – Earl Woods, American colonel, baseball player, and author (b. 1932)
2007 – Warja Honegger-Lavater, Swiss illustrator (b. 1913)
  2007   – Wally Schirra, American captain, pilot, and astronaut (b. 1923)
  2007   – Knock Yokoyama, Japanese politician (b. 1932)
2008 – Leopoldo Calvo-Sotelo, Spanish engineer and politician, Prime Minister of Spain (b. 1926)
2009 – Renée Morisset, Canadian pianist (b. 1928)
  2009   – Ram Balkrushna Shewalkar, Indian author and critic (b. 1931)
2010 – Roy Carrier, American accordion player (b. 1947)
  2010   – Peter O'Donnell, English soldier and author (b. 1920)
  2010   – Guenter Wendt, German-American engineer (b. 1923)
2011 – Jackie Cooper, American actor, television director, producer and executive (b. 1922)
  2011   – Sergo Kotrikadze, Georgian footballer and manager (b. 1936)
  2011   – Thanasis Veggos, Greek actor and director (b. 1927)
2012 – Jorge Illueca, Panamanian politician, 30th President of Panama (b. 1918)
  2012   – Felix Werder, German-Australian composer, conductor, and critic (b. 1922)
2013 – Joe Astroth, American baseball player (b. 1922)
  2013   – Herbert Blau, American engineer and academic (b. 1926)
  2013   – Cedric Brooks, Jamaican-American saxophonist and flute player (b. 1943)
  2013   – Keith Carter, American swimmer and soldier (b. 1924)
  2013   – Brad Drewett, Australian tennis player and sportscaster (b. 1958)
  2013   – David Morris Kern, American pharmacist, co-invented Orajel (b. 1909)
  2013   – Curtis Rouse, American football player (b. 1960)
  2013   – Branko Vukelić, Croatian politician, 11th Minister of Defence for Croatia (b. 1958)
2014 – Gary Becker, American economist and academic, Nobel Prize laureate (b. 1930)
  2014   – Francisco Icaza, Mexican painter (b. 1930)
  2014   – Jim Oberstar, American educator and politician (b. 1934)
2015 – Revaz Chkheidze, Georgian director and screenwriter (b. 1926)
  2015   – Danny Jones, Welsh rugby player (b. 1986)
  2015   – Warren Smith, American golfer and coach (b. 1915)
2016 – Ian Deans, Canadian politician (b. 1937)
  2016   – Jadranka Stojaković, Yugoslav singer-songwriter  (b. 1950)
2017 – Daliah Lavi, Israeli actress, singer and model (b. 1942)
2020 – Victoria Barbă, Moldovan animated film director (b. 1926)
2021 – Lloyd Price, an American R&B vocalist (b. 1933)

Holidays and observances
 Christian feast day:
 Abhai (Syriac Orthodox Church)
 Antonia and Alexander
 Juvenal of Narni
 Moura (Coptic Church)
 Philip and James the Lesser
 Pope Alexander I
 Sarah the Martyr (Coptic Church)
 The Most Holy Virgin Mary, Queen of Poland 
 Theodosius of Kiev (Eastern Orthodox Church)
 May 3 (Eastern Orthodox liturgics)
 Constitution Memorial Day (Japan)
 Constitution Day (Poland)
 Finding of the Holy Cross-related observances:
 Fiesta de las Cruces (Spain and Hispanic America)
  International Sun Day
 World Press Freedom Day

References

External links

 BBC: On This Day
 
 Historical Events on May 3

Days of the year
May